Plein is a municipality in Rhineland-Palatinate, Germany.

Plein may also refer to:
 Plein, The Hague, a city square in The Hague, Netherlands

People with the surname
 Philipp Plein (born 1978), German fashion designer
 Jacques Plein (born 1987), Luxembourgian footballer